Triptilion is a genus of South American flowering plants in the family Asteraceae.

 Species
 Triptilion achilleae DC. - Chile, Argentina
 Triptilion benaventei J.Rémy - Chile
 Triptilion berteroi Phil. - Chile
 Triptilion capillatum (D.Don) Hook. & Arn. - Chile, Argentina
 Triptilion cordifolium Lag. ex Lindl.  - Chile
 Triptilion gibbosum J.Rémy - Chile
 Triptilion spinosum Ruiz & Pav. - Chile

 formerly included
species now considered more suited to Nassauvia

References

Nassauvieae
Asteraceae genera
Flora of South America